Pak Sha Wan Peninsula, also known as Ma Nam Wat Peninsula, is a peninsula in the Sai Kung District in the New Territories of Hong Kong.

Geography
Pak Sha Wan Peninsula spans south from the village of Tsiu Hang. It forms the eastern edge of Hebe Haven and separates it from Inner Port Shelter (Sai Kung Hoi).

Features
 Villages established along the shores of Pak Sha Wan Peninsula include Ma Nam Wat
 A section of the waters offshore of Ma Nam Wat is one of the 26 designated marine fish culture zones in Hong Kong.
 Trio Beach is located on Pak Sha Wan Peninsula

See also
 List of islands and peninsulas of Hong Kong

References

Peninsulas of Hong Kong
Sai Kung District